The 1981 Hang Ten 400 was an endurance race for Group C Touring Cars. The event, which was Round 3 of the 1981 Australian Endurance Championship, was staged on 13 September over 119 laps of the 3.1 km Sandown International Motor Racing Circuit in Victoria, Australia. It was the 16th race in the history of what is now known as the Sandown 500.

Peter Brock drove a Marlboro Holden Dealer Team Holden VC Commodore to a record sixth consecutive Sandown endurance win and his seventh victory in the race. 1981 Australian Touring Car Champion Dick Johnson finished second after starting from pole position in the Plamer Tube Mills Ford XD Falcon. Third was the Roadways Gown Hindhaugh Holden VC Commodore of Steven Harrington and Garth Wigston.

Colin Bond and Steve Masterton were the winners of Class B in a Ford Capri V6, while Sydney's Peter Williamson won Class C with a Toyota Celica. Class D was won by Craig Bradtke and Rod Stevens driving a Mitsubishi Lancer.

Classes
The field was divided into four engine capacity classes:
 Class A : 3001 to 6000 cc
 Class B : 2001 to 3000 cc
 Class C : 1601 to 2000 cc
 Class D : Up to 1600 cc

Results

Statistics
 Entries in Official Programme - 55
 Pole Position - Dick Johnson (Ford XD Falcon) - 1m 11.9s
 Starters - 46
 Finishers - 26
 Non-finishers - 20
 Race time of winning car - 2h 30m 39.6s
 Fastest Lap - Unknown

References

Further reading
The Official Racing History of Holden, 1988, page 308
The Age, Monday, 14 September 1981, page 30

External links
Touring Cars 1981, www.autopics.com.au

Motorsport at Sandown
Hang Ten 400
Pre-Bathurst 500